Jean-Louis Pezant (5 October 1938 in Dun-le-Palestel, Creuse – 24 July 2010) was a member of the Constitutional Council of France from 2004 until his death.

Bibliography
 Les Idées Politiques de Waldeck-Rousseau (1962)
 Le Nouveau Statut de Paris : loi du 31 décembre 1975 (1977)
 L'Election des Députés (co-author, 1997)
 L'Assemblée Nationale (co-author, 2007)

References

1938 births
2010 deaths
People from Creuse
Sciences Po alumni
Knights of the Ordre national du Mérite